The Wedding Party may refer to:

"The Wedding Party" (Fawlty Towers), the third episode in the first season of the TV series Fawlty Towers, aired in 1975
The Wedding Party (1969 film), an American comedy film created by three directors
The Wedding Party (2016 film), a Nigerian romantic comedy film
The Wedding Party (2010 film), an Australian comedy film starring Josh Lawson and Isabel Lucas
The Wedding Party (2017 film), an American comedy film starring Blake Lee